This page lists all described species of the spider family Araneidae as of Dec. 20, 2016, that start with letters B through F.

Backobourkia
Backobourkia Framenau et al., 2010
 Backobourkia brouni (Urquhart, 1885) — Australia, New Zealand
 Backobourkia collina (Keyserling, 1886) — Australia
 Backobourkia heroine (L. Koch, 1871) (type species) — Australia, New Caledonia, Norfolk Islands, possibly New Zealand

Bertrana
Bertrana Keyserling, 1884
 Bertrana abbreviata (Keyserling, 1879) — Colombia
 Bertrana arena Levi, 1989 — Costa Rica
 Bertrana benuta Levi, 1994 — Colombia
 Bertrana elinguis (Keyserling, 1883) — Ecuador, Peru, Brazil, French Guiana
 Bertrana laselva Levi, 1989 — Costa Rica
 Bertrana nancho Levi, 1989 — Peru
 Bertrana planada Levi, 1989 — Colombia, Ecuador
 Bertrana poa Levi, 1994 — Ecuador
 Bertrana rufostriata Simon, 1893 — Venezuela, Brazil
 Bertrana striolata Keyserling, 1884 (type species) — Costa Rica to Argentina
 Bertrana urahua Levi, 1994 — Ecuador
 Bertrana vella Levi, 1989 — Panama, Colombia

Caerostris
Caerostris Thorell, 1868
 Caerostris almae Gregorič, 2015 -   Madagascar 
 Caerostris bojani Gregorič, 2015 -  Madagascar 
 Caerostris corticosa Pocock, 1902 — South Africa
 Caerostris cowani Butler, 1882 — Madagascar
 Caerostris darwini Kuntner & Agnarsson, 2010 — Madagascar
 Caerostris ecclesiigera Butler, 1882 — Madagascar
 Caerostris extrusa Butler, 1882 — Madagascar
 Caerostris hirsuta (Simon, 1895) — Madagascar
 Caerostris indica Strand, 1915 — Myanmar
 Caerostris linnaeus Gregorič, 2015 - Mozambique 
 Caerostris mayottensis Grasshoff, 1984 — Comoro Islands
 Caerostris mitralis (Vinson, 1863) (type species) — Central Africa, Madagascar
 Caerostris pero Gregorič, 2015 - Madagascar 
 Caerostris sexcuspidata (Fabricius, 1793) — Africa, Madagascar, Comoro Islands, Aldabra
 Caerostris sumatrana Strand, 1915 — India to China, Borneo
 Caerostris tinamaze Gregorič, 2015 - South Africa 
 Caerostris vicina (Blackwall, 1866) — Central, Southern Africa
 Caerostris wallacei Gregorič, Blackledge, Agnarsson & Kuntner, 2015 -  Madagascar

Carepalxis
Carepalxis L. Koch, 1872
 Carepalxis beelzebub (Hasselt, 1873) — Victoria
 Carepalxis bilobata Keyserling, 1886 — Queensland
 Carepalxis camelus Simon, 1895 — Paraguay, Argentina
 Carepalxis coronata (Rainbow, 1896) — New South Wales
 Carepalxis lichensis Rainbow, 1916 — Queensland
 Carepalxis montifera L. Koch, 1872 (type species) — Queensland
 Carepalxis perpera (Petrunkevitch, 1911) — Mexico
 Carepalxis poweri Rainbow, 1916 — New South Wales
 Carepalxis salobrensis Simon, 1895 — Jamaica, Mexico to Brazil
 Carepalxis suberosa Thorell, 1881 — New Guinea
 Carepalxis tricuspidata Chrysanthus, 1961 — New Guinea
 Carepalxis tuberculata Keyserling, 1886 — Queensland, New South Wales

Celaenia
Celaenia Thorell, 1868
 Celaenia atkinsoni (O. P.-Cambridge, 1879) — Australia, Tasmania, New Zealand
 Celaenia calotoides Rainbow, 1908 — New South Wales
 Celaenia distincta (O. P.-Cambridge, 1869) — New South Wales, Tasmania
 Celaenia dubia (O. P.-Cambridge, 1869) — New South Wales, Victoria
 Celaenia excavata (L. Koch, 1867) (type species) — Australia, Tasmania
 Celaenia hectori (O. P.-Cambridge, 1879) — New Zealand
 Celaenia olivacea (Urquhart, 1885) — New Zealand
 Celaenia penna (Urquhart, 1887) — New Zealand
 Celaenia tuberosa (Urquhart, 1889) — New Zealand
 Celaenia tumidosa Urquhart, 1891 — Tasmania
 Celaenia voraginosa Urquhart, 1891 — Tasmania

Cercidia
Cercidia Thorell, 1869
 Cercidia levii Marusik, 1985 — Kazakhstan
 Cercidia prominens (Westring, 1851) (type species) — Holarctic
 Cercidia punctigera Simon, 1889 — India

Chorizopes
Chorizopes O. P.-Cambridge, 1870
 Chorizopes albus Mi, Wang & Peng, 2016 - China 
 Chorizopes anjanes Tikader, 1965 — India
 Chorizopes antongilensis Emerit, 1997 — Madagascar
 Chorizopes calciope (Simon, 1895) — India
 Chorizopes congener O. P.-Cambridge, 1885 — India
 Chorizopes dicavus Yin et al., 1990 — China
 Chorizopes frontalis O. P.-Cambridge, 1870 (type species) — Sri Lanka to Sumatra
 Chorizopes goosus Yin et al., 1990 — China
 Chorizopes kastoni Gajbe & Gajbe, 2004 — India
 Chorizopes khandaricus Gajbe, 2005 — India
 Chorizopes khanjanes Tikader, 1965 — India, China
 Chorizopes khedaensis Reddy & Patel, 1993 — India
 Chorizopes longus Mi, Wang & Peng, 2016 -  China 
 Chorizopes madagascariensis Emerit, 1997 — Madagascar
 Chorizopes mucronatus Simon, 1895 — Sri Lanka
 Chorizopes nipponicus Yaginuma, 1963 — China, Korea, Japan
 Chorizopes orientalis Simon, 1909 — Vietnam
 Chorizopes pateli Reddy & Patel, 1993 — India
 Chorizopes quadrituberculata Roy, Sen, Saha & Raychaudhuri, 2014 -  India 
 Chorizopes rajanpurensis Mukhtar & Tahir, 2013 — Pakistan
 Chorizopes shimenensis Yin & Peng, 1994 — China
 Chorizopes stoliczkae O. P.-Cambridge, 1885 — India
 Chorizopes tikaderi Sadana & Kaur, 1974 — India
 Chorizopes trimamillatus Schenkel, 1963 — China
 Chorizopes tumens Yin et al., 1990 — China
 Chorizopes wulingensis Yin, Wang & Xie, 1994 — China
 Chorizopes zepherus Zhu & Song, 1994 — China

Cladomelea
Cladomelea Simon, 1895
 Cladomelea akermani Hewitt, 1923 — South Africa
 Cladomelea debeeri Roff & Dippenaar-Schoeman, 2004 — South Africa
 Cladomelea longipes (O. P.-Cambridge, 1877) (type species) — Congo
 Cladomelea ornata Hirst, 1907 — Central Africa

Clitaetra
Clitaetra Simon, 1889
 Clitaetra clathrata Simon, 1907 — West Africa
 Clitaetra episinoides Simon, 1889 — Comoro Islands
 Clitaetra irenae Kuntner, 2006 — South Africa
 Clitaetra perroti Simon, 1894 — Madagascar
 Clitaetra simoni Benoit, 1962 — Congo
 Clitaetra thisbe Simon, 1903 — Sri Lanka

Cnodalia
Cnodalia Thorell, 1890
 Cnodalia ampliabdominis (Song, Zhang & Zhu, 2006) — China
 Cnodalia flavescens Mi, Peng & Yin, 2010 — China
 Cnodalia harpax Thorell, 1890 (type species) — Sumatra, Japan
 Cnodalia quadrituberculata Mi, Peng & Yin, 2010 — China

Coelossia
Coelossia Simon, 1895
 Coelossia aciculata Simon, 1895 (type species) — Sierra Leone
 Coelossia trituberculata Simon, 1903 — Mauritius, Madagascar

Colaranea
Colaranea Court & Forster, 1988
 Colaranea brunnea Court & Forster, 1988 — New Zealand
 Colaranea melanoviridis Court & Forster, 1988 — New Zealand
 Colaranea verutum (Urquhart, 1887) — New Zealand
 Colaranea viriditas (Urquhart, 1887) (type species) — New Zealand

Collina
Collina Urquhart, 1891
 Collina glabicira Urquhart, 1891 — Tasmania

Colphepeira
Colphepeira Archer, 1941
 Colphepeira catawba (Banks, 1911) — USA, Mexico

Cryptaranea
Cryptaranea Court & Forster, 1988
 Cryptaranea albolineata (Urquhart, 1893) — New Zealand
 Cryptaranea atrihastula (Urquhart, 1891) — New Zealand
 Cryptaranea invisibilis (Urquhart, 1892) (type species) — New Zealand
 Cryptaranea stewartensis Court & Forster, 1988 — New Zealand
 Cryptaranea subalpina Court & Forster, 1988 — New Zealand
 Cryptaranea subcompta (Urquhart, 1887) — New Zealand
 Cryptaranea venustula (Urquhart, 1891) — New Zealand

Cyclosa
Cyclosa Menge, 1866
 Cyclosa alayoni Levi, 1999 — Cuba, Puerto Rico
 Cyclosa alba Tanikawa, 1992 — Japan
 Cyclosa albisternis Simon, 1888 — India, Andaman Islands, Hawaii
 Cyclosa albopunctata Kulczynski, 1901 — Africa, New Guinea, New Caledonia
 Cyclosa algerica Simon, 1885 — Mediterranean
 Cyclosa andinas Levi, 1999 — Colombia, Ecuador
 Cyclosa angusta Tanikawa, 1992 — Japan
 Cyclosa argentata Tanikawa & Ono, 1993 — Taiwan
 Cyclosa argenteoalba Bösenberg & Strand, 1906 — Russia, China, Korea, Taiwan, Japan
 Cyclosa atrata Bösenberg & Strand, 1906 — Russia, China, Korea, Japan
 Cyclosa baakea Barrion & Litsinger, 1995 — Philippines
 Cyclosa bacilliformis Simon, 1908 — Western Australia
 Cyclosa banawensis Barrion & Litsinger, 1995 — Philippines
 Cyclosa berlandi Levi, 1999 — USA, Hispaniola to Ecuador
 Cyclosa bianchoria Yin et al., 1990 — China
 Cyclosa bifida (Doleschall, 1859) — India to Philippines, New Guinea
 Cyclosa bifurcata (Walckenaer, 1841) — Costa Rica, Hispaniola to Argentina
 Cyclosa bihamata Zhang, Zhang & Zhu, 2010 — China
 Cyclosa bilobata Sen, Saha & Raychaudhuri, 2012 — India
 Cyclosa bituberculata Biswas & Raychaudhuri, 1998 — Bangladesh
 Cyclosa bulleri (Thorell, 1881) — New Guinea
 Cyclosa cajamarca Levi, 1999 — Peru
 Cyclosa caligata (Thorell, 1890) — Sumatra
 Cyclosa camargoi Levi, 1999 — Brazil
 Cyclosa camelodes (Thorell, 1878) — Seychelles, New Guinea
 Cyclosa caroli (Hentz, 1850) — USA, West Indies to Bolivia
 Cyclosa centrifaciens Hingston, 1927 — Myanmar
 Cyclosa centrodes (Thorell, 1887) — India to Singapore
 Cyclosa cephalodina Song & Liu, 1996 — China
 Cyclosa chichawatniensis Mukhtar & Mushtaq, 2005 — Pakistan
 Cyclosa circumlucens Simon, 1907 — Guinea-Bissau, Sao Tome
 Cyclosa concolor Caporiacco, 1933 — Libya
 Cyclosa confraga (Thorell, 1892) — India, Bangladesh to Malaysia
 Cyclosa confusa Bösenberg & Strand, 1906 — China, Korea, Taiwan, Japan
 Cyclosa conica (Pallas, 1772) (type species) — Holarctic
 Cyclosa conigera F. O. P.-Cambridge, 1904 — Mexico to Honduras
 Cyclosa coylei Levi, 1999 — Mexico, Guatemala
 Cyclosa cucurbitoria (Yin et al., 1990) — China, Thailand
 Cyclosa cucurbitula Simon, 1900 — Hawaii
 Cyclosa curiraba Levi, 1999 — Bolivia
 Cyclosa cylindrata Yin, Zhu & Wang, 1995 — China
 Cyclosa cylindrifaciens Hingston, 1927 — Myanmar
 Cyclosa damingensis Xie, Yin & Kim, 1995 — China
 Cyclosa deserticola Levy, 1998 — Egypt, Israel
 Cyclosa dianasilvae Levi, 1999 — Ecuador, Peru
 Cyclosa diversa (O. P.-Cambridge, 1894) — Mexico, Cuba to Argentina
 Cyclosa dives Simon, 1877 — China, Philippines
 Cyclosa donking Levi, 1999 — Bolivia
 Cyclosa dosbukolea Barrion & Litsinger, 1995 — Philippines
 Cyclosa durango Levi, 1999 — Mexico
 Cyclosa elongata Biswas & Raychaudhuri, 1998 — Bangladesh
 Cyclosa espumoso Levi, 1999 — Brazil
 Cyclosa fililineata Hingston, 1932 — Panama to Argentina
 Cyclosa formosa Karsch, 1879 — West Africa
 Cyclosa formosana Tanikawa & Ono, 1993 — Taiwan
 Cyclosa fuliginata (L. Koch, 1872) — New South Wales, Victoria
 Cyclosa ginnaga Yaginuma, 1959 — China, Korea, Taiwan, Japan
 Cyclosa gossypiata Keswani, 2013 — India
 Cyclosa groppalii Pesarini, 1998 — Balearic Islands
 Cyclosa gulinensis Xie, Yin & Kim, 1995 — China
 Cyclosa haiti Levi, 1999 — Hispaniola, Jamaica, Mona Islands
 Cyclosa hamulata Tanikawa, 1992 — Russia, Japan
 Cyclosa hexatuberculata Tikader, 1982 — India, Pakistan
 Cyclosa hova Strand, 1907 — Madagascar
 Cyclosa huila Levi, 1999 — Colombia
 Cyclosa imias Levi, 1999 — Cuba
 Cyclosa inca Levi, 1999 — Colombia to Argentina
 Cyclosa informis Yin, Zhu & Wang, 1995 — China
 Cyclosa insulana (Costa, 1834) — Mediterranean to Philippines, Australia
 Cyclosa ipilea Barrion & Litsinger, 1995 — Philippines
 Cyclosa jalapa Levi, 1999 — Mexico
 Cyclosa japonica Bösenberg & Strand, 1906 — Russia, China, Korea, Taiwan, Japan
 Cyclosa jose Levi, 1999 — Costa Rica
 Cyclosa kashmirica Caporiacco, 1934 — Karakorum
 Cyclosa kibonotensis Tullgren, 1910 — Central, East Africa, Seychelles
 Cyclosa koi Tanikawa & Ono, 1993 — Taiwan
 Cyclosa krusa Barrion & Litsinger, 1995 — Pakistan, Philippines
 Cyclosa kumadai Tanikawa, 1992 — Russia, Korea, Japan
 Cyclosa laticauda Bösenberg & Strand, 1906 — China, Korea, Taiwan, Japan
 Cyclosa lawrencei Caporiacco, 1949 — Kenya
 Cyclosa libertad Levi, 1999 — Ecuador, Peru
 Cyclosa litoralis (L. Koch, 1867) — Samoa, Fiji, Tahiti
 Cyclosa longicauda (Taczanowski, 1878) — Colombia to Argentina
 Cyclosa machadinho Levi, 1999 — Brazil, Argentina
 Cyclosa maderiana Kulczynski, 1899 — Madeira, Canary Islands
 Cyclosa maritima Tanikawa, 1992 — Japan
 Cyclosa mavaca Levi, 1999 — Colombia, Venezuela
 Cyclosa meruensis Tullgren, 1910 — East Africa
 Cyclosa micula (Thorell, 1892) — India, Singapore
 Cyclosa minora Yin, Zhu & Wang, 1995 — China
 Cyclosa mocoa Levi, 1999 — Colombia
 Cyclosa mohini Dyal, 1935 — Pakistan
 Cyclosa monteverde Levi, 1999 — Costa Rica, Panama
 Cyclosa monticola Bösenberg & Strand, 1906 — Russia, China, Korea, Taiwan, Japan
 Cyclosa moonduensis Tikader, 1963 — India
 Cyclosa morretes Levi, 1999 — Brazil
 Cyclosa mulmeinensis (Thorell, 1887) — Africa to Japan, Philippines
 Cyclosa neilensis Tikader, 1977 — Andaman Islands
 Cyclosa nevada Levi, 1999 — Colombia
 Cyclosa nigra Yin et al., 1990 — China
 Cyclosa nodosa (O. P.-Cambridge, 1889) — Guatemala to Costa Rica
 Cyclosa norihisai Tanikawa, 1992 — China, Japan
 Cyclosa oatesi (Thorell, 1892) — Andaman Islands
 Cyclosa octotuberculata Karsch, 1879 — China, Korea, Taiwan, Japan
 Cyclosa oculata (Walckenaer, 1802) — Palearctic
 Cyclosa ojeda Levi, 1999 — Curaçao
 Cyclosa okumae Tanikawa, 1992 — Russia, Korea, Japan
 Cyclosa olivenca Levi, 1999 — Brazil
 Cyclosa olorina Simon, 1900 — Hawaii
 Cyclosa omonaga Tanikawa, 1992 — China, Korea, Taiwan, Japan
 Cyclosa onoi Tanikawa, 1992 — China, Japan
 Cyclosa oseret Levi, 1999 — Brazil
 Cyclosa otsomarka Barrion & Litsinger, 1995 — Philippines
 Cyclosa pantanal Levi, 1999 — Brazil
 Cyclosa parangdives Barrion, Barrion-Dupo & Heong, 2013 - China 
 Cyclosa parangmulmeinensis Barrion & Litsinger, 1995 — Philippines
 Cyclosa parangtarugoa Barrion & Litsinger, 1995 — Philippines
 Cyclosa paupercula Simon, 1893 — Borneo
 Cyclosa pedropalo Levi, 1999 — Colombia
 Cyclosa pellaxoides Roewer, 1955 — Singapore
 Cyclosa pentatuberculata Yin, Zhu & Wang, 1995 — China
 Cyclosa perkinsi Simon, 1900 — Hawaii
 Cyclosa picchu Levi, 1999 — Peru
 Cyclosa pichilinque Levi, 1999 — Mexico
 Cyclosa pseudoculata Schenkel, 1936 — China
 Cyclosa psylla (Thorell, 1887) — Myanmar, Japan
 Cyclosa punctata Keyserling, 1879 — Brazil
 Cyclosa punjabiensis Ghafoor & Beg, 2002 — Pakistan
 Cyclosa purnai Keswani, 2013 — India
 Cyclosa pusilla Simon, 1880 — New Caledonia
 Cyclosa quinqueguttata (Thorell, 1881) — India, Bhutan, Myanmar, China, Taiwan
 Cyclosa reniformis Zhu, Lian & Chen, 2006 — China
 Cyclosa rhombocephala (Thorell, 1881) — Queensland
 Cyclosa rubronigra Caporiacco, 1947 — Costa Rica to Brazil
 Cyclosa sachikoae Tanikawa, 1992 — Japan
 Cyclosa saismarka Barrion & Litsinger, 1995 — Pakistan, Philippines
 Cyclosa sanctibenedicti (Vinson, 1863) — Reunion
 Cyclosa santafe Levi, 1999 — Colombia
 Cyclosa sedeculata Karsch, 1879 — China, Korea, Japan
 Cyclosa senticauda Zhu & Wang, 1994 — China
 Cyclosa serena Levi, 1999 — Chile, Argentina
 Cyclosa seriata (Thorell, 1881) — Java
 Cyclosa shinoharai Tanikawa & Ono, 1993 — Taiwan
 Cyclosa sierrae Simon, 1870 — Europe to Georgia
 Cyclosa simoni Tikader, 1982 — India
 Cyclosa simplicicauda Simon, 1900 — Hawaii
 Cyclosa simplicicauda rufescens Simon, 1900 — Hawaii
 Cyclosa spirifera Simon, 1889 — India, Pakistan
 Cyclosa tamanaco Levi, 1999 — Trinidad
 Cyclosa tapetifaciens Hingston, 1932 — Panama to Argentina
 Cyclosa tardipes (Thorell, 1895) — Myanmar
 Cyclosa tardipes ignava (Thorell, 1895) — Myanmar
 Cyclosa tauraai Berland, 1933 — Marquesas Islands
 Cyclosa teresa Levi, 1999 — Brazil
 Cyclosa tricolor (Leardi, 1902) — Philippines
 Cyclosa trilobata (Urquhart, 1885) — Australia, Tasmania, New Zealand
 Cyclosa tripartita Tullgren, 1910 — East Africa
 Cyclosa triquetra Simon, 1895 — Mexico, West Indies to Peru
 Cyclosa tropica Biswas & Raychaudhuri, 1998 — Bangladesh
 Cyclosa tuberascens Simon, 1906 — India
 Cyclosa turbinata (Walckenaer, 1841) — USA to Panama, West Indies, Galapagos Islands, Hawaii
 Cyclosa turvo Levi, 1999 — Brazil
 Cyclosa vallata (Keyserling, 1886) — China, Korea, Taiwan, Japan to Australia
 Cyclosa vicente Levi, 1999 — Colombia, Brazil, Argentina
 Cyclosa vieirae Levi, 1999 — Peru, Brazil
 Cyclosa walckenaeri (O. P.-Cambridge, 1889) — USA to Guyana, West Indies
 Cyclosa woyangchuan Zhang, Zhang & Zhu, 2010 — China
 Cyclosa xanthomelas Simon, 1900 — Hawaii
 Cyclosa yaginumai Biswas & Raychaudhuri, 1998 — Bangladesh
 Cyclosa zhangmuensis Hu & Li, 1987 — China

Cyphalonotus
Cyphalonotus Simon, 1895
 Cyphalonotus assuliformis Simon, 1909 — Vietnam
 Cyphalonotus benoiti Archer, 1965 — Congo
 Cyphalonotus columnifer Simon, 1903 — Madagascar
 Cyphalonotus elongatus Yin, Peng & Wang, 1994 — China
 Cyphalonotus larvatus (Simon, 1881) (type species) — Congo, East Africa, Socotra
 Cyphalonotus selangor Dzulhelmi, 2015 - Malaysia 
 Cyphalonotus sumatranus Simon, 1899 — Sumatra

Cyrtarachne
Cyrtarachne Thorell, 1868
 Cyrtarachne akirai Tanikawa, 2013 - China, Korea, Taiwan, Japan 
 Cyrtarachne avimerdaria Tikader, 1963 — India
 Cyrtarachne bengalensis Tikader, 1961 — India, China
 Cyrtarachne bicolor Thorell, 1898 — Myanmar
 Cyrtarachne bigibbosa Simon, 1907 — Sao Tome, Bioko
 Cyrtarachne bilunulata Thorell, 1899 — Cameroon
 Cyrtarachne biswamoyi Tikader, 1961 — India
 Cyrtarachne bufo (Bösenberg & Strand, 1906) — China, Korea, Japan
 Cyrtarachne cingulata Thorell, 1895 — Myanmar
 Cyrtarachne conica O. P.-Cambridge, 1901 — Malaysia
 Cyrtarachne dimidiata Thorell, 1895 — Myanmar
 Cyrtarachne fangchengensis Yin & Zhao, 1994 — China
 Cyrtarachne finniganae Lessert, 1936 — Mozambique
 Cyrtarachne flavopicta Thorell, 1899 — Cameroon, Equatorial Guinea
 Cyrtarachne friederici Strand, 1911 — New Guinea
 Cyrtarachne gibbifera Simon, 1899 — Sumatra
 Cyrtarachne gilva Yin & Zhao, 1994 — China
 Cyrtarachne grubei (Keyserling, 1864) (type species) — Mauritius
 Cyrtarachne guttigera Simon, 1909 — Vietnam
 Cyrtarachne heminaria Simon, 1909 — Vietnam
 Cyrtarachne histrionica Thorell, 1898 — Myanmar
 Cyrtarachne hubeiensis Yin & Zhao, 1994 — China
 Cyrtarachne ignava Thorell, 1895 — Myanmar
 Cyrtarachne inaequalis Thorell, 1895 — India to Japan
 Cyrtarachne invenusta Thorell, 1891 — Nicobar Islands
 Cyrtarachne ixoides (Simon, 1870) — Mediterranean to Georgia, Madagascar
 Cyrtarachne jucunda Tanikawa, 2013 -  Japan 
 Cyrtarachne lactea Pocock, 1898 — East Africa
 Cyrtarachne laevis Thorell, 1877 — Sumatra, Flores, Sulawesi
 Cyrtarachne latifrons Hogg, 1900 — Victoria
 Cyrtarachne latifrons atuberculata Hogg, 1900 — Victoria
 Cyrtarachne lepida Thorell, 1890 — Sumatra
 Cyrtarachne madagascariensis Emerit, 2000 — Madagascar
 Cyrtarachne melanoleuca Ono, 1995 — Thailand
 Cyrtarachne melanosticta Thorell, 1895 — Myanmar
 Cyrtarachne menghaiensis Yin, Peng & Wang, 1994 — China
 Cyrtarachne nagasakiensis Strand, 1918 — China, Korea, Japan
 Cyrtarachne nodosa Thorell, 1899 — Cameroon, Bioko, Yemen
 Cyrtarachne pallida O. P.-Cambridge, 1885 — Yarkand
 Cyrtarachne perspicillata (Doleschall, 1859) — Sri Lanka, Sumatra, Java, New Guinea
 Cyrtarachne perspicillata possoica Merian, 1911 — Sulawesi
 Cyrtarachne promilai Tikader, 1963 — India
 Cyrtarachne raniceps Pocock, 1900 — India, Sri Lanka
 Cyrtarachne rubicunda L. Koch, 1871 — New South Wales
 Cyrtarachne schmidi Tikader, 1963 — India
 Cyrtarachne sinicola Strand, 1942 — China
 Cyrtarachne sundari Tikader, 1963 — India
 Cyrtarachne sunjoymongai Ahmed, Sumukha, Khalap, Mohan & Jadhav, 2015 -  India 
 Cyrtarachne szetschuanensis Schenkel, 1963 — China
 Cyrtarachne termitophila Lawrence, 1952 — Congo
 Cyrtarachne tricolor (Doleschall, 1859) — Moluccas to Australia
 Cyrtarachne tricolor aruana Strand, 1911 — Aru Islands
 Cyrtarachne tuladepilachna Barrion & Litsinger, 1995 — Philippines
 Cyrtarachne xanthopyga Kulczynski, 1911 — New Guinea
 Cyrtarachne yunoharuensis Strand, 1918 — China, Korea, Japan

Cyrtobill
Cyrtobill Framenau & Scharff, 2009
 Cyrtobill darwini Framenau & Scharff, 2009 — Australia

Cyrtophora
Cyrtophora Simon, 1864
 Cyrtophora admiralia Strand, 1913 — Admiralty Islands
 Cyrtophora beccarii (Thorell, 1878) — Laos, Malaysia to Northern Territory
 Cyrtophora bicauda (Saito, 1933) — Taiwan
 Cyrtophora bidenta Tikader, 1970 — India
 Cyrtophora bimaculata Han, Zhang & Zhu, 2010 — China
 Cyrtophora caudata Bösenberg & Lenz, 1895 — East Africa
 Cyrtophora cephalotes Simon, 1877 — Philippines
 Cyrtophora cicatrosa (Stoliczka, 1869) — Pakistan to Northern Territory
 Cyrtophora citricola (Forsskal, 1775) (type species) — Old World, Greater Antilles, Costa Rica, Colombia
 Cyrtophora citricola abessinensis Strand, 1906 — Ethiopia
 Cyrtophora citricola lurida Karsch, 1879 — West Africa
 Cyrtophora citricola minahassae Merian, 1911 — Sulawesi
 Cyrtophora cordiformis (L. Koch, 1871) — New Guinea, Queensland, Lord Howe Islands
 Cyrtophora crassipes (Rainbow, 1897) — New South Wales
 Cyrtophora cylindroides (Walckenaer, 1841) — China to Queensland
 Cyrtophora cylindroides scalaris Strand, 1915 — New Britain
 Cyrtophora diazoma (Thorell, 1890) — Sumatra
 Cyrtophora doriae (Thorell, 1881) — New Guinea, Bismarck Archipel
 Cyrtophora eczematica (Thorell, 1892) — Malaysia, Java, Sulawesi, New Guinea
 Cyrtophora exanthematica (Doleschall, 1859) — Myanmar to Philippines, New South Wales
 Cyrtophora feai (Thorell, 1887) — India to Myanmar
 Cyrtophora forbesi (Thorell, 1890) — Sumatra
 Cyrtophora gazellae (Karsch, 1878) — New Britain
 Cyrtophora gemmosa Thorell, 1899 — Cameroon
 Cyrtophora guangxiensis Yin et al., 1990 — China
 Cyrtophora hainanensis Yin et al., 1990 — China
 Cyrtophora hirta L. Koch, 1872 — Queensland, New South Wales
 Cyrtophora ikomosanensis (Bösenberg & Strand, 1906) — Taiwan, Japan
 Cyrtophora jabalpurensis Gajbe & Gajbe, 1999 — India
 Cyrtophora koronadalensis Barrion & Litsinger, 1995 — Philippines
 Cyrtophora ksudra Sherriffs, 1928 — India
 Cyrtophora lacunaris Yin et al., 1990 — China
 Cyrtophora lahirii Biswas & Raychaudhuri, 2004 — Bangladesh
 Cyrtophora larinioides Simon, 1895 — Cameroon
 Cyrtophora limbata (Thorell, 1898) — Myanmar
 Cyrtophora lineata Kulczynski, 1910 — Solomon Islands, Bismarck Archipel
 Cyrtophora moluccensis (Doleschall, 1857) — India to Japan, Australia
 Cyrtophora moluccensis albidinota Strand, 1911 — Caroline Islands, Palau, Yap
 Cyrtophora moluccensis bukae Strand, 1911 — Solomon Islands
 Cyrtophora moluccensis cupidinea (Thorell, 1875) — New Caledonia
 Cyrtophora moluccensis margaritacea (Doleschall, 1859) — Java
 Cyrtophora moluccensis rubicundinota Strand, 1911 — Keule Islands, near New Guinea
 Cyrtophora monulfi Chrysanthus, 1960 — New Guinea, Northern Territory
 Cyrtophora nareshi Biswas & Raychaudhuri, 2004 — Bangladesh
 Cyrtophora parangexanthematica Barrion & Litsinger, 1995 — Philippines
 Cyrtophora parnasia L. Koch, 1872 — Australia, Tasmania
 Cyrtophora petersi Karsch, 1878 — Mozambique
 Cyrtophora rainbowi (Roewer, 1955) — New South Wales
 Cyrtophora sextuberculata Tanikawa & Petcharad, 2015 -  Thailand 
 Cyrtophora subacalypha (Simon, 1882) — Aden
 Cyrtophora trigona (L. Koch, 1871) — Queensland, New Guinea
 Cyrtophora unicolor (Doleschall, 1857) — Sri Lanka to Japan, Philippines, New Guinea, Christmas Islands

Deione
Deione Thorell, 1898
 Deione lingulata Han, Zhu & Levi, 2009 — China
 Deione ovata Mi, Peng & Yin, 2010 — China
 Deione renaria Mi, Peng & Yin, 2010 — China
 Deione thoracica Thorell, 1898 (type species) — Myanmar

Deliochus
Deliochus Simon, 1894
 Deliochus pulcher Rainbow, 1916 — Queensland
 Deliochus pulcher melanius Rainbow, 1916 — Queensland
 Deliochus zelivira (Keyserling, 1887) (type species) — Australia, Tasmania

Demadiana
Demadiana Strand, 1929
 Demadiana carrai Framenau, Scharff & Harvey, 2010 — New South Wales
 Demadiana cerula (Simon, 1908) — Western Australia
 Demadiana complicata Framenau, Scharff & Harvey, 2010 — Queensland
 Demadiana diabolus Framenau, Scharff & Harvey, 2010 — South Australia, Tasmania
 Demadiana milledgei Framenau, Scharff & Harvey, 2010 — New South Wales, Victoria
 Demadiana simplex (Karsch, 1878) (type species) — Southern Australia

Dolophones
Dolophones Walckenaer, 1837
 Dolophones bituberculata Lamb, 1911 — Queensland
 Dolophones clypeata (L. Koch, 1871) — Moluccas, Australia
 Dolophones conifera (Keyserling, 1886) — Australia
 Dolophones elfordi Dunn & Dunn, 1946 — Victoria
 Dolophones intricata Rainbow, 1915 — South Australia
 Dolophones macleayi (Bradley, 1876) — Queensland
 Dolophones mammeata (Keyserling, 1886) — Australia
 Dolophones maxima Hogg, 1900 — Victoria
 Dolophones nasalis (Butler, 1876) — Queensland
 Dolophones notacantha (Quoy & Gaimarg, 1824) (type species) — New South Wales
 Dolophones peltata (Keyserling, 1886) — Australia, Lord Howe Islands
 Dolophones pilosa (Keyserling, 1886) — Australia
 Dolophones simpla (Keyserling, 1886) — New South Wales
 Dolophones testudinea (L. Koch, 1871) — Australia, New Caledonia
 Dolophones thomisoides Rainbow, 1915 — South Australia
 Dolophones tuberculata (Keyserling, 1886) — New South Wales
 Dolophones turrigera (L. Koch, 1867) — Queensland, New South Wales

Dubiepeira
Dubiepeira Levi, 1991
 Dubiepeira amablemaria Levi, 1991 — Peru
 Dubiepeira amacayacu Levi, 1991 — Colombia, Peru, Brazil
 Dubiepeira dubitata (Soares & Camargo, 1948) (type species) — Venezuela to Brazil
 Dubiepeira lamolina Levi, 1991 — Ecuador, Peru
 Dubiepeira neptunina (Mello-Leitao, 1948) — Colombia, Peru, Guyana, French Guiana

Edricus
Edricus O. P.-Cambridge, 1890
 Edricus productus O. P.-Cambridge, 1896 — Mexico
 Edricus spiniger O. P.-Cambridge, 1890 (type species) — Panama to Ecuador

Enacrosoma
Enacrosoma Mello-Leitao, 1932
 Enacrosoma anomalum (Taczanowski, 1873) (type species) — Colombia, Peru to Brazil, French Guiana
 Enacrosoma decemtuberculatum (O. P.-Cambridge, 1890) — Guatemala
 Enacrosoma frenca Levi, 1996 — Mexico to Panama
 Enacrosoma javium Levi, 1996 — Costa Rica, Panama
 Enacrosoma multilobatum (Simon, 1897) — Peru
 Enacrosoma quizarra Levi, 1996 — Costa Rica

Encyosaccus
Encyosaccus Simon, 1895
 Encyosaccus sexmaculatus Simon, 1895 — Colombia, Ecuador, Peru, Brazil

Epeiroides
Epeiroides Keyserling, 1885
 Epeiroides bahiensis (Keyserling, 1885) — Costa Rica to Brazil

Eriophora
Eriophora Simon, 1864
 Eriophora biapicata (L. Koch, 1871) — Australia
 Eriophora conica (Yin, Wang & Zhang, 1987) — China
 Eriophora edax (Blackwall, 1863) — USA to Brazil
 Eriophora flavicoma (Simon, 1880) — New Caledonia, Loyalty Islands
 Eriophora fuliginea (C. L. Koch, 1838) — Honduras to Brazil
 Eriophora nephiloides (O. P.-Cambridge, 1889) — Guatemala to Guyana
 Eriophora neufvilleorum (Lessert, 1930) — Congo, Ethiopia
 Eriophora pustulosa (Walckenaer, 1841) — Australia, Tasmania, New Zealand
 Eriophora ravilla (C. L. Koch, 1844) (type species) — USA to Brazil
 Eriophora transmarina (Keyserling, 1865) — New Guinea, Australia, Samoa

Eriovixia
Eriovixia Archer, 1951
 Eriovixia cavaleriei (Schenkel, 1963) — China
 Eriovixia enshiensis (Yin & Zhao, 1994) — China
 Eriovixia excelsa (Simon, 1889) — India, Pakistan, China, Taiwan, Philippines, Indonesia
 Eriovixia gryffindori Ahmed, Khalap & Sumukha, 2016 — India
 Eriovixia hainanensis (Yin et al., 1990) — China
 Eriovixia huwena Han & Zhu, 2010 — China
 Eriovixia jianfengensis Han & Zhu, 2010 — China
 Eriovixia laglaizei (Simon, 1877) — India, China to Philippines, New Guinea
 Eriovixia mahabaeus (Barrion & Litsinger, 1995) — Philippines
 Eriovixia menglunensis (Yin et al., 1990) — China
 Eriovixia napiformis (Thorell, 1899) — Cameroon to East Africa, Yemen
 Eriovixia nigrimaculata Han & Zhu, 2010 — China
 Eriovixia palawanensis (Barrion & Litsinger, 1995) — , Philippines
 Eriovixia patulisus (Barrion & Litsinger, 1995) — Philippines
 Eriovixia poonaensis (Tikader & Bal, 1981) — India, China
 Eriovixia pseudocentrodes (Bösenberg & Strand, 1906) — China, Laos, Japan
 Eriovixia rhinura (Pocock, 1899) (type species) — West, Central Africa
 Eriovixia sakiedaorum Tanikawa, 1999 — Hainan, Taiwan, Japan
 Eriovixia sticta Mi, Peng & Yin, 2010 — China
 Eriovixia turbinata (Thorell, 1899) — Cameroon, Congo
 Eriovixia yunnanensis (Yin et al., 1990) — China

Eustacesia
Eustacesia Caporiacco, 1954
 Eustacesia albonotata Caporiacco, 1954 — French Guiana

Eustala
Eustala Simon, 1895
 Eustala albicans Caporiacco, 1954 — French Guiana
 Eustala albiventer (Keyserling, 1884) — Brazil
 Eustala anastera (Walckenaer, 1841) (type species) — North, Central America
 Eustala andina Chamberlin, 1916 — Peru
 Eustala bacelarae Caporiacco, 1955 — Venezuela
 Eustala banksi Chickering, 1955 — Mexico, Costa Rica
 Eustala belissima Poeta, Marques & Buckup, 2010 — Brazil
 Eustala bifida F. O. P.-Cambridge, 1904 — USA to Panama
 Eustala bisetosa Bryant, 1945 — Hispaniola
 Eustala brevispina Gertsch & Davis, 1936 — USA, Mexico
 Eustala bucolica Chickering, 1955 — Panama
 Eustala californiensis (Keyserling, 1885) — USA, Mexico
 Eustala cameronensis Gertsch & Davis, 1936 — USA
 Eustala catarina Poeta, 2014 - Brazil 
 Eustala cazieri Levi, 1977 — USA, Bahama Islands
 Eustala cepina (Walckenaer, 1841) — North America
 Eustala cidae Poeta, 2014 - Brazil 
 Eustala clavispina (O. P.-Cambridge, 1889) — USA to El Salvador
 Eustala conchlea (McCook, 1888) — USA, Mexico
 Eustala conformans Chamberlin, 1925 — Panama
 Eustala crista Poeta, Marques & Buckup, 2010 — Brazil
 Eustala cuia Poeta, 2014 - Brazil 
 Eustala delasmata Bryant, 1945 — Hispaniola
 Eustala delecta Chickering, 1955 — Panama
 Eustala devia (Gertsch & Mulaik, 1936) — USA to Panama, West Indies
 Eustala eldorado Poeta, 2014 - Brazil 
 Eustala eleuthera Levi, 1977 — USA, Bahama Islands, Jamaica
 Eustala emertoni (Banks, 1904) — USA, Mexico
 Eustala ericae Poeta, 2014 - Brazil 
 Eustala essequibensis (Hingston, 1932) — Guyana
 Eustala exigua Chickering, 1955 — Panama
 Eustala farroupilha Poeta, 2014 - Brazil 
 Eustala fragilis (O. P.-Cambridge, 1889) — Guatemala, Panama
 Eustala fuscovittata (Keyserling, 1864) — Mexico, Cuba to South America
 Eustala gonygaster (C. L. Koch, 1838) — Brazil, Guyana
 Eustala guarani Poeta, 2014 -  Brazil 
 Eustala guianensis (Taczanowski, 1873) — Peru, French Guiana
 Eustala guttata F. O. P.-Cambridge, 1904 — Mexico to Brazil
 Eustala histrio Mello-Leitao, 1948 — Panama, Guyana
 Eustala illicita (O. P.-Cambridge, 1889) — Mexico to Brazil
 Eustala inconstans Chickering, 1955 — Panama
 Eustala ingenua Chickering, 1955 — Guatemala to Panama
 Eustala innoxia Chickering, 1955 — Panama
 Eustala itapocuensis Strand, 1916 — Brazil
 Eustala lata Chickering, 1955 — Panama
 Eustala latebricola (O. P.-Cambridge, 1889) — Guatemala to Panama
 Eustala levii Poeta, Marques & Buckup, 2010 — Brazil
 Eustala lisei Poeta, 2014 - Brazil, Uruguay 
 Eustala lunulifera Mello-Leitao, 1939 — French Guiana, Guyana
 Eustala maxima Chickering, 1955 — Panama
 Eustala meridionalis Baert, 2014 - Galapagos Is. 
 Eustala mimica Chickering, 1955 — Panama
 Eustala minuscula (Keyserling, 1892) — Brazil
 Eustala monticola Chamberlin, 1916 — Peru
 Eustala montivaga Chickering, 1955 — Panama
 Eustala mourei Mello-Leitao, 1947 — Brazil
 Eustala mucronatella (Roewer, 1942) — Brazil
 Eustala nasuta Mello-Leitao, 1939 — Panama, Guyana, Brazil
 Eustala nigerrima Mello-Leitao, 1940 — Brazil
 Eustala novemmamillata Mello-Leitao, 1941 — Argentina
 Eustala oblonga Chickering, 1955 — Panama
 Eustala occidentalis Baert, 2014 -  Galapagos Is. 
 Eustala orientalis Baert, 2014 -  Galapagos Is. 
 Eustala pallida Mello-Leitao, 1940 — Brazil
 Eustala palmares Poeta, Marques & Buckup, 2010 — Brazil, Uruguay
 Eustala perdita Bryant, 1945 — Hispaniola
 Eustala perfida Mello-Leitao, 1947 — Brazil
 Eustala photographica Mello-Leitao, 1944 — Brazil, Uruguay, Argentina
 Eustala redundans Chickering, 1955 — Panama
 Eustala rosae Chamberlin & Ivie, 1935 — USA, Mexico
 Eustala rubroguttulata (Keyserling, 1879) — Peru
 Eustala rustica Chickering, 1955 — Panama
 Eustala saga (Keyserling, 1893) — Brazil, Uruguay
 Eustala sagana (Keyserling, 1893) — Brazil
 Eustala scitula Chickering, 1955 — Mexico to Panama
 Eustala scutigera (O. P.-Cambridge, 1898) — Mexico to Panama
 Eustala secta Mello-Leitao, 1945 — Brazil, Argentina
 Eustala sedula Chickering, 1955 — Panama
 Eustala semifoliata (O. P.-Cambridge, 1899) — Central America
 Eustala smaragdinea (Taczanowski, 1878) — Peru
 Eustala tantula Chickering, 1955 — Panama
 Eustala taquara (Keyserling, 1892) — Brazil, Uruguay, Argentina
 Eustala tribrachiata Badcock, 1932 — Paraguay
 Eustala tridentata (C. L. Koch, 1838) — Brazil, French Guiana
 Eustala trinitatis (Hogg, 1918) — Trinidad
 Eustala tristis (Blackwall, 1862) — Brazil
 Eustala ulecebrosa (Keyserling, 1892) — Brazil, Argentina
 Eustala uncicurva Franganillo, 1936 — Cuba
 Eustala unimaculata Franganillo, 1930 — Cuba
 Eustala vegeta (Keyserling, 1865) — Mexico to Brazil, Hispaniola
 Eustala vellardi Mello-Leitao, 1924 — Brazil
 Eustala viridipedata (Roewer, 1942) — Peru
 Eustala wiedenmeyeri Schenkel, 1953 — Venezuela

Exechocentrus
Exechocentrus Simon, 1889
 Exechocentrus lancearius Simon, 1889 (type species) — Madagascar
 Exechocentrus madilina Scharff & Hormiga, 2012 — Madagascar

Faradja
Faradja Grasshoff, 1970
 Faradja faradjensis (Lessert, 1930) — Congo

Friula
Friula O. P.-Cambridge, 1896
 Friula wallacei O. P.-Cambridge, 1896 — Borneo

References

  (2014): The world spider catalog, version 17.5. American Museum of Natural History. 

Lists of spider species by family